Niu Quaia is a mixed choir from Edermunde-Grifte, North Hesse, Germany, who sing rock, pop, soul and jazz. They are conducted by Thorsten Seydler, a professional musician based in Trendelburg, North Hesse, Germany.

The name Niu Quaia is pronounced in German as "new choir". The choir is one of two that belong to the 125-year-old 'Gesangvereins 1889 Grifte' (Choral Society of Grifte); the other one is the  Young Voices.

Niu Quaia was founded on 18 June 1997. They celebrated their fifteenth anniversary in 2012 and their twentieth anniversary in 2017.

The choir consists of ca. 30–35 people who rehearse every Tuesday from 8–10 pm in the village town hall in Edermünde-Grifte. Every year there is one weekend workshop and every two years they go on tour. In 2011 the choir gave a concert in Berlin; in 2013 the choir went to Bedfordshire, England for 4 days, and, in 2015, the choir went to Vienna, Austria for 4 days.

Concerts 
 Old Botanical Garden of Göttingen University, Göttingen, 2 September 2012
 Edermunde-Grifte Church, 23. February 2013
 St. Andrew's Church, Ampthill, Bedfordshire, UK, 31 May 2013
 St. Mary Magdalene Church, Westoning, UK, 1 June 2013
 part of Fünf Chöre – Ein Klang (engl. five choirs – one sound), Vellmar, Sommer-im-Park, 21 August 2013 
 Jubilee Besse Choral Society, Besse, 25 May 2014
 Old Botanical Garden of Göttingen University, Göttingen, 22 June 2014
 125-year Jubilee 'Gesangvereins 1889 Grifte', Edermunde-Grifte Church, 6 July 2014

Press reviews 

 Concert in the Old Botanical Garden of Göttingen University, 15 June 2008

 Concert in Rotenberg Martin-Luther Church, 17 February 2010

 Concert at Town Partnership Meeting of Felsberg und Vernouillet, 7 June 2010

 "Sommer im Park" Performance in Vellmar, 21 August 2013

 "Sommer im Park" Performance in Vellmar, 21 August 2013

 Jubilee of the Grifte Choral Society, 26 January 2014

 125-year Jubilee of the Grifte Choral Society in 2014

References

External links 
 Official website of the choir, in German.

German choirs